American pop rock band Waterparks has released four studio albums, three extended plays, one live album, one demo album, thirty three singles, and thirty one music videos. The band has self-released two EPs, Airplane Conversations (2012) and Black Light (2014). The band's third EP, Cluster (2016) was released via Equal Vision. The band released their first studio album, Double Dare, later in 2016 via Equal Vision. Their second studio album Entertainment was released under the same label in 2018. On May 23, 2019, the band announced that they had left Equal Vision and signed on with Hopeless. Their third studio album, Fandom, was released in 2019. In 2020, the band signed with 300 Entertainment and their fourth studio album, Greatest Hits, was released in 2021.

Studio albums

Extended plays

Live albums

Demo albums

Singles

Music videos

References

External links
 

Discographies of American artists
Pop punk group discographies